The Casalmaggiore Madonna is a lost oil on canvas painting by Correggio, measuring 28 by 24 cm and painted around 1522.

History
A copy in Frankfurt (in poor condition and probably transferred from canvas to panel) and a preparatory sketch are the only evidence of the work. The sketch is on the back of a sheet of designs for a fresco at the San Giovanni Evangelista church in Parma, dating the Casalmaggiore Madonna commission to November 1522.

The painting showed the Madonna and Child with an infant St John the Baptist, a motif revisited several times by Correggio from his youth (in Madonna and Child with the Infant John the Baptist for example) onwards.

The Frankfurt work has divided critics - some see it as a copy of a lost original and others as an autograph work by Correggio in poor condition which may have entered the Galleria Estense when Francesco I occupied Casalmaggiore in1646.

Bibliography
 Giuseppe Adani, Correggio pittore universale, Silvana Editoriale, Correggio 2007.

External links

Paintings of the Madonna and Child by Correggio
1522 paintings
Lost paintings
Paintings depicting John the Baptist